3β-Etiocholanediol, or epietiocholanediol, also known as 3β,5β-androstanediol or as etiocholane-3β,17β-diol, is a naturally occurring etiocholane (5β-androstane) steroid and an endogenous metabolite of testosterone. It is formed from 5β-dihydrotestosterone (after 5β-reduction of testosterone) and is transformed into epietiocholanolone.

See also 
 3α-Etiocholanediol
 3α-Androstanediol
 3β-Androstanediol

References 

Diols
Etiocholanes
Human metabolites